Mushchininskaya is a rural locality (a village) in Tiginskoye Rural Settlement, Vozhegodsky District, Vologda Oblast, Russia. The population was 14 as of 2002.

Geography 
Mushchininskaya is located 52 km northwest of Vozhega (the district's administrative centre) by road. Baranikha is the nearest rural locality.

References 

Rural localities in Vozhegodsky District